Borzabad (also Romanized as Borzābād; also known as Burzābād) is a village in Farmahin Rural District, in the Central District of Farahan County, Markazi Province, Iran. At the 2006 census, its population was 185, in 71 families.

References 

Populated places in Farahan County